Basta is a 2021 Indian Marathi-language comedy drama film directed by Tanaji Ghadge and produced by Sunil Phadtare. The film stars Sayali Sanjeev, Subodh Bhave and Parth Bhalerao. It was released in India on 29 January 2021.

Plot 
The story of this film is about families of a bride and groom who goes shopping (Marathi: बस्ता) for their wedding. During the shopping various comedy drama events takes place.

Cast 
 Parth Bhalerao
 Subodh Bhave
 Rohit Chavan
 Kishore Chougule
 Bharat Ganeshpure
 Shubhangi Gokhale
 Prajakta Hanamghar
 Kalpana Jagtap
 Madhavi Juvekar
 Sagar Karande
 Sanjay Kulkarni
 Kishor Mahabole
 Suhas Palshikar
 Pallavi Patil
 Suraj Pawar
 Sayali Sanjeev
 Arbaz Shaikh
 Neeta Shende
 Yogesh Shirsat
 Jyoti Subhash
 Akshay Tanksale

References

External links 
 
Basta at ZEE5

2020s Marathi-language films
Indian comedy-drama films
2021 films
2021 comedy-drama films